Surface Thrills is the first of two 1983 albums released by the American R&B vocal group, the Temptations, on Motown Records' Gordy label.

Overview 
In this album the group attempts to fuse their vocal harmonies with rock music production, resulting in a radical departure from the Temptations' signature soul sound.  It was produced by Dennis Lambert and Steve Barri and features musical contributions from Jeff Porcaro of Toto, Raymond Lee Brown of Earth, Wind & Fire, and longtime James Brown collaborator Fred Wesley.

Surface Thrills yielded two singles, the title track and "Love on My Mind Tonight", with only the latter being moderately successful.  This is the last Temptations album to feature falsetto Glenn Leonard, who departed from the group after eight years.  Leonard's replacement would be singer-songwriter Ron Tyson, who made his Temptations debut with the following album, Back to Basics, though the group previously worked with Tyson when they were with Atlantic Records on the Hear to Tempt You album where Tyson co-wrote a majority of the songs.

Track listing 
Superscripts denote lead singers for each track: (a) Dennis Edwards, (b) Glenn Leonard, (c) Richard Street, (d) Melvin Franklin, (e) Otis Williams.

All tracks produced by Dennis Lambert and Steve Barri except where noted.

Side one 
 "Surface Thrills" (Lambert, Harold Payne) – 4:30 a
 "Love on My Mind Tonight" (Lambert, Peter Beckett) – 4:57 a
 "One Man Woman" (Lambert, Beckett) – 5:13 a, b, c, d, e
 "Show Me Your Love" (Terry Skinner, J.L. Wallace, Ken Bell) – 4:02 c

Side two 
 "The Seeker" (Lambert, Michael Price, Dan Walsh) – 4:30 a
 "What a Way to Put It" (Steve Dees, Ron Kersey) – 4:37 a(produced by the Temptations and Benjamin Wright)
 "Bringyourbodyhere (Exercise Chant)" (Otis Williams, David English, Benjamin Wright, Louis Price) – 5:13 a, b, c, d, e(co-produced by the Temptations and Benjamin Wright)
 "Made in America" (M. Price, Walsh) – 3:58 a

Personnel
Performers
Dennis Edwards - vocals (baritone/tenor)
Melvin Franklin - vocals (bass)
Glenn Leonard - vocals (tenor/falsetto)
Richard Street - vocals (tenor)
Otis Williams - vocals (tenor/baritone)
Clydene Jackson, Julia Waters, Maxine Waters - background vocals ("Bringyourbodyhere")

Musicians
Raymond Lee Brown, Nolan Smith - trumpet
George Bohanon, Fred Wesley - trombone
Robbie Buchanan - drums, Linn computer, Moog bass, synthesizer, Fender Rhodes synthesizer, percussion synthesizer
Paulinho da Costa - percussion
Richard Elliot - saxophone, lyricon
Gary Herbig, Terry Harrington - saxophone, flute, piccolo
Paul M. Jackson, Jr. - guitar, rhythm arranger
Gabe Katona - synthesizer
Dennis Lambert - vocal arranger, synthesizer, percussion synthesizer
Roger Nichols - percussion synthesizer-Wendel
Jeff Porcaro, John Robinson - drums
Freddie Washington - bass
Benjamin Wright - arranger

Charts

Singles

References

External links 
 Surface Thrills at Discogs
 Surface Thrills at Rate Your Music

1983 albums
The Temptations albums
Albums produced by Steve Barri
Gordy Records albums